This page provides supplementary chemical data on m-Xylene.

Material Safety Data Sheet  

The handling of this chemical may incur notable safety precautions. It is highly recommend that you seek the Material Safety Datasheet (MSDS) for this chemical from a reliable source such as SIRI, and follow its directions.

Structure and properties

Thermodynamic properties

Vapor pressure of liquid

Table data obtained from CRC Handbook of Chemistry and Physics 44th ed.

Distillation data
See also:
p-xylene (data page)
o-xylene (data page)

Spectral data

References

Xylene
Chemical data pages cleanup